The Crow Comes Last is a short story collection by Italo Calvino published in 1949. It consists of thirty stories inspired by the novelist's own experiences fighting with the Communist Garibaldi Brigades in the Maritime Alps during the final phases of World War II. The stories also include sharp observations on the panorama of postwar Italy. Although written largely in the neorealist style, many scenes are infused with visionary, fable-like elements characteristic of Calvino's later fantasy period. 

A wide selection of these short stories comprised the following English collections by the author: Adam, One Afternoon, and Other Stories (1957), The Watcher and Other Stories (1975), and Difficult Loves (1984).

Footnotes

1949 short story collections
Italian resistance movement
Short story collections by Italo Calvino
Giulio Einaudi Editore books